The 1961 Dallas Cowboys season was their second in the National Football League. The team finished with 4 wins, 9 losses, and 1 tie, placing them 6th in the Eastern Conference.

Offseason
The Cowboys participated in their first NFL college draft following the 1960 season. Despite owning the league's worst record, the team picked second overall because the expansion Minnesota Vikings received the first overall selection. However, the team previously traded away their first round pick in the 1961 draft to the Washington Redskins for quarterback Eddie LeBaron. The Cowboys had another selection in the first round (13th overall) that they acquired from the Cleveland Browns, and with that selection they chose defensive lineman Bob Lilly from Texas Christian University. Other notable selections in the draft included offensive linemen E.J. Holub, Billy Shaw, and Stew Barber. However, all three chose to sign with teams in the rival American Football League.

Other notable acquisitions by the Cowboys during the offseason included trading for linebacker Chuck Howley from the Chicago Bears, and signing rookie free agents Amos Marsh and Warren Livingston.

The Cowboys played in the NFL's Western Division for the 1960 season, but were a "swing team" and played each of the other 12 teams in the league that year. When the Minnesota Vikings joined the league for the 1961 season, the owners of the Eastern Division teams were allowed to vote on which expansion franchise they wanted to be permanently assigned to their division. In April 1961, the Eastern Division owners voted for Dallas, largely as a safeguard against early winters in Minnesota. This also pleased Western Division owners, who preferred the Vikings because of lower travel expenses and natural geographic rivalries with teams like the Green Bay Packers and Chicago Bears. This resulted in both Eastern and Western Divisions having seven teams.

Schedule

Conference opponents are in bold text

Season recap
Coming off of a winless first season, the Cowboys wasted no time getting their first win in franchise history in their second season. The first game in the history of the Cowboys was a loss to the Pittsburgh Steelers, and the team's first victory came against the Steelers in a 27–24 home game in the season opener, the winning points coming on a last second field goal. The Cowboys would go on to win two of their next three, both easy victories coming over the expansion Minnesota Vikings, and a month into the season the Cowboys found themselves tied for first in the Eastern Conference with a record of 3–1.

While much improved over their first season, the Cowboys would continue to be outclassed by the better teams in the league. In between their victories over the Vikings the Cowboys suffered a 25–7 defeat at the hands of perennial powerhouse Cleveland. The following weeks after their 3–1 start quickly dampened any realistic chance they had of contending for the Eastern Conference championship, with home losses to the New York Giants and the defending champion Philadelphia Eagles coming by a combined score of 74–17. However, the following week the team stunned the Giants at Yankee Stadium, 16–14, on another late field goal, and the Cowboys found themselves with a winning record at the midway point of the season at 4–3.

Unfortunately, it was all downhill from there, as the Cowboys did not win another game all season. The Cowboys gave up 28 points or more in each of their remaining seven games, and were beaten by 14 or more points in five of them. The Cowboys managed a tie against the woeful Washington Redskins in week 10, a game in which quarterback Don Meredith, who had been splitting playing time at the position with Eddie LeBaron, suffered an injury to his throwing shoulder, and would not play again the rest of the season. The final game of the season saw the Cowboys lose to the Redskins at D.C. Stadium (the Redskins first win at their new home), 34–24, the only win of the Redskins season.

Offensively, the Cowboys were an improved lot across the board. The offense moved the ball at a decent pace, finishing 8th in the league in yards gained. Quarterbacks Eddie LeBaron and Don Meredith had quality targets at the receiver position, which helped the team finish 6th in passing yardage. Veteran Billy Howton established a career-high in receptions with 56, and Frank Clarke developed into one of the league's top deep threats, averaging 22.4 yards per catch and scoring 9 touchdowns. Tight end Dick Bielski represented the Cowboys at the Pro Bowl. The Cowboys may have showed the most improvement in the running game. Rookie Don Perkins was one of the league's top running backs with 815 yards, and Amos Marsh and J.W. Lockett contributed as well, improving the Cowboys to 10th in total yards rushing, and improving the yards per carry from 3.4 in 1960 to 4.4 in 1961. On the negative side, the offense turned the ball over 48 times during the season, second worst in the league, and the offensive line continued to struggle protecting the quarterback. The team only scored 236 points (13th in the league) despite the Cowboys improved offensive play.

Defensively, the team continued to struggle against the run, allowing 2161 rushing yards (12th in the league) and 4.8 yards per carry. Against the pass, the secondary allowed too many long completions (a league worst 15.7 yards per completion) and the defensive front did not apply much pressure on the quarterback. The defense did make more than its share of big plays, forcing 43 turnovers. Cornerback Don Bishop had 8 of the defense's 25 interceptions.

Rookie kicker Allen Green struggled much of the season. His 36.7 yards per punt was worst in the league, and after going 5 of 15 on field goal attempts (though two of the field goals provided the game winning points) he was replaced by Dick Bielski, who made 6 out 9 field goals the rest of the season. Rookie running backs Amos Marsh and Don Perkins helped improve the kickreturn game, with Marsh in particular standing out with a 25.7 yard average on kick returns.

NFL Draft

Roster

Standings

See also
 1961 NFL season
 1961 NFL Draft

Publications
 The Football Encyclopedia 
 Total Football 
 Cowboys Have Always Been My Heroes

References

External links
 1961 Dallas Cowboys
 Pro Football Hall of Fame
 Dallas Cowboys Official Site

Dallas Cowboys seasons
Dallas Cowboys
Dallas Cowboys